Oxford Road Show is a music show that aired on BBC2 from 16 January 1981 to 29 March 1985. It was broadcast from the BBC's New Broadcasting House in Oxford Road, Manchester. The show featured live music, pop music news and competitions and was also presented as addressing issues for young adults by young adults.

Many bands and artists popular at the time performed on the show including Duran Duran, Siouxsie and the Banshees, The Cure, Magnum, The Psychedelic Furs, Queen, Spandau Ballet, UFO, Big Country, The Alarm, Simple Minds, XTC, Madness, Japan, U2, Marillion, Soft Cell, The Farm, Tears for Fears, Bauhaus, Orchestral Manoeuvres in the Dark, The Undertones, UB40, China Crisis, Frankie Goes to Hollywood, The Beat, Wah!, Dead or Alive, Bronski Beat, Spear of Destiny, Sade, Ultravox and The Smiths.

Transmissions

References

External links
 

1981 British television series debuts
1985 British television series endings
1980s British music television series
BBC Television shows
Television shows set in Manchester
English-language television shows